Events from the year 1959 in Sweden

Incumbents
 Monarch – Gustaf VI Adolf
 Prime Minister – Tage Erlander

Events
The Lycksele Zoo established

Popular culture

Film
26 January – Fröken Chic released
13 November – Raggare! released

Births
8 January – Björn Jilsén, handball player.
9 January – Tommy Holmgren, football player
27 January – Göran Hägglund, politician
24 April – Ronnie Båthman, tennis player
22 May – Lotta Falkenbäck, figure skater.
23 May – Daniel Alfredson, film director
14 June – Håkan Södergren, ice hockey player
3 July – Jens Nordqvist, sprint canoer.
29 July – Jöran Hägglund, politician
16 August – Gunilla Röör, actress
23 August – Christina Herrström, screenwriter
30 October – Glenn Hysén, football player and manager
13 December – Staffan William-Olsson, jazz musician

Deaths

1 March – Ragnar Malm, cyclist (born 1893).
8 March – Olle Hjortzberg, painter and illustrator (born 1872)
20 March – Einar Svensson, ice hockey player (born 1894)
26 March – Frans Lindstrand, wrestler (born 1883).
11 May – Arvid Spångberg, diver (born 1890)
20 July – Karl Ansén, football player (born 1887).
19 November – Douglas Håge, actor (born 1898)
7 December – Nils Bolander, bishop (born 1902)
11 December – Gustaf Weidel, gymnast (born 1890).

References

 
Sweden
Years of the 20th century in Sweden